Archery at the 2012 Summer Paralympics consisted of nine events, five for men and four for women. The competitions were held at the Royal Artillery Barracks from 30 August to 5 September 2012.

Classification
Archers were given a classification depending on the type and extent of their disability. The classification system allowed archers to compete against others with a similar level of function.

Archery classes are:
 Wheelchair 1 (W1)
 Wheelchair 2 (W2)
 Standing (ST)

Competition schedule

Participating nations
139 archers from 29 nations competed.

Medal summary

Medal table

Men's events

Women's events

See also
Archery at the 2012 Summer Olympics

References

 
2012
2012 Summer Paralympics events
International archery competitions hosted by the United Kingdom